"Leavin's for Unbelievers" is a song written by Randy Goodrum and Brent Maher, and recorded by American country music artist Dottie West.  It was released in June 1980 as the third single from the album Special Delivery.  The song peaked at number 13 on the Billboard Hot Country Singles chart. "Leavin's for Unbelievers" was the third and final single spawned from West's 1979 album entitled, Special Delivery.

Chart performance

References

1980 singles
Dottie West songs
Songs written by Randy Goodrum
Song recordings produced by Larry Butler (producer)
United Artists Records singles
Songs written by Brent Maher
1979 songs